

Codes

References

V